Jacques-Henri Brunet is a Central African Republic Olympic hurdler. He represented his country in the men's 400 metres hurdles at the 1992 Summer Olympics. His time was a 52.59 in the hurdles. He is the Central African Republic record holder in the 110 metres hurdles with a time of 14.76 seconds.

References

1967 births
Living people
People from Bangui
Central African Republic hurdlers
Male hurdlers
Olympic athletes of the Central African Republic
Athletes (track and field) at the 1992 Summer Olympics